Moskva is a district of Chüy Region in northern Kyrgyzstan. The administrative seat lies at Belovodskoye.

History
Moskva District was established as Stalin District on July 23, 1930. In 1961, as part of de-Stalinization, it was renamed into Moskva District, after the city of Moscow.

Population
Moskva District is ethnically diverse. A plurality of the population (46.1%) are ethnic Kyrgyz. Large minority of Russians (23.3%) and Dungans inhabit in the district as well. Smaller population of Uzbeks, Ukrainians, and Kurds also inhabit in the district.

Rural communities and villages
In total, Moskva District includes 28 settlements in 12 rural communities. Each rural community can include one or several villages. The rural communities and settlements in the Moskva District are:

 Ak-Suu (seat: Tömön-Suu; and also villages Ak-Bashat, Ak-Torpok, Bala-Ayylchi, Keper-Aryk, Murake and Chong-Aryk)
 Aleksandrovka (seat: Aleksandrovka; incl. Besh-Örük and Krupskaya)
 Belovodskoye (seat: Belovodskoye; incl. Kosh-Döbö)
 Besh-Terek (seat: Besh-Terek)
 Birinchi May (seat: Ak-Suu)
 Chapaev (seat: Spartak; incl. Ak-Söök and Malovodnoye)
 Petrovka (seat: Petrovka; incl. Zavodskoye and Kyzyl-Tuu)
 Predtechenka (seat: Predtechenka; incl. Ang-Aryk)
 Sadovy (seat: Sadovoye)
 Sretenka (seat: Sretenka; incl. Bolshevik and Zarya)
 Tölök (seat: Tölök)
 Tselinny (seat: Kyz-Molo)

References 

Districts of Chüy Region